The 18th Alpini Regiment is an inactive regiment of the Italian Army's mountain infantry speciality, the Alpini, which distinguished itself in combat during World War I and World War II.

History 
The regiment was formed on 13 September 1997 by elevating the existing Alpini Battalion "Edolo" to regiment. Between 1 November 1886 and 1 October 1975 the battalion was one of the battalions of the 5th Alpini Regiment. After the 5th Alpini Regiment was disbanded during the 1975 Italian Army reform the battalion, based in Meran, became one of the battalions of the Alpine Brigade "Tridentina". As the traditions and war flag of the 5th Alpini Regiment were assigned to the Alpini Battalion "Morbegno", the Edolo was granted a new war flag on 12 November 1976 by decree 846 of the President of the Italian Republic Giovanni Leone. The two Gold Medals of Military Valour and the Messina earthquake Medal of Merit awarded to the 5th Alpini Regiment, were duplicated for the new flag of the Edolo, and the Silver Medal of Military Valour awarded to the Edolo for its conduct at Derna on 29 May 1913 during the Italian conquest of Libya was transferred from the flag of the 5th Alpini to the Edolo's flag.

The regiment was tasked with the training of the recruits for the Alpini regiments based in the Trentino-Alto Adige/Südtirol region of northern Italy. On 1 March 1998 the regiment was transferred from the Alpine Brigade "Tridentina" to the Alpine Corps Command. With the suspension of compulsory military service the regiment was dissolved on 30 September 2004.

Structure 
When the regiment was disbanded it had the following structure:

  Regimental Command
  18th Command and Logistic Support Company "L'indispensabile"
  Alpini Battalion "Edolo"
  50th Alpini Company "La balda"
  51st Alpini Company "La veloce"
  52nd Alpini Company "La ferrea"
  110th Mortar Company "La nobile" (in reserve status since 1975)

External links
 18th Alpini Regiment on vecio.it

Source 
 Franco dell'Uomo, Rodolfo Puletti: L'Esercito Italiano verso il 2000 - Volume Primo - Tomo I, Rome 1998, Stato Maggiore dell'Esercito - Ufficio Storico, page: 519

References 

Alpini regiments of Italy
Military units and formations established in 1997
Military units and formations disestablished in 2004
Recipients of the Silver Medal of Military Valor